The Ambassador of Australia to Mongolia is an officer of the Australian Department of Foreign Affairs and Trade and the head of the Embassy of the Commonwealth of Australia to Mongolia. The Ambassador resides in Ulaanbaatar. In 2008, Australia moved its diplomatic accreditation to Mongolia from Beijing to Seoul. Australia's first resident Ambassador to Mongolia, John Langtry, was appointed in December 2015. Australia appointed an Honorary Consul in Ulaanbaatar in 2007, and in 2011 an office of Austrade opened in Ulaanbaatar. That office was upgraded to an Australian Consulate-General which opened on 30 March 2012.

List of officeholders

Heads of mission

Consul-General and Trade Commissioners

See also
Foreign relations of Australia
Foreign relations of Mongolia

References

External links
Australian Embassy, Mongolia
Embassy of Mongolia, Australia

 
Mongolia
Australia